Cytoprotection is a process by which chemical compounds provide protection to cells against harmful agents.

Gastric cytoprotectant

A gastric cytoprotectant is any medication that combats ulcers not by reducing gastric acid but by increasing mucosal protection. Examples of gastric cytoprotective agents include prostaglandins which protect the stomach mucosa against injury by increasing gastric mucus secretion. Nonsteroidal anti-inflammatory drugs (NSAIDs) inhibit the synthesis of prostaglandins and thereby make the stomach more susceptible to injury.  Gastric cytoprotective drugs include carbenoxolone, deglycyrrhizinised liquorice, sucralfate (aluminium hydroxide and sulphated sucrose), misoprostol (a prostaglandin analogue), bismuth chelate (tri-potassium di-citrato bismuthate) and zinc L-carnosine.

References 

Clinical pharmacology